The Monastery of Carmelitas Descalzas de San José y Santa Teresa, better known as the Monastery of Santa Teresa in Arequipa, is a religious complex that houses a community of cloistered Discalced Carmelites nuns and the Virceroyalty Art Museum of Santa Teresa. It was founded in 1700 and is a sample of Andean Baroque architecture. It is located in the historic center of Arequipa (Peru), so it is part of the UNESCO World Heritage Site.

Architecture
The monastery is located on the corner of Melgar and Peral streets. Like other colonial buildings in Arequipa, it is built with pieces of white volcanic stone, locally known as tuff. The monastery has a beautiful temple with a single nave, a high altar with a beautiful silver tabernacle, five side altars and three choirs: the Lower Choir, the Upper Choir and in an intermediate location, the so-called Choir of the Musicians. In addition, next to the main nave, there is a tower with its bell tower.

The cloister opened as a Museum, has 12 Exhibition Rooms open to the public, while the rest of the monastery is reserved for the closure. Among the rooms that can be visited, are the Lower Choir and the Chapter House, which remain intact as in the colonial era, while in the other ten rooms of the complex, the objects are exhibited in a thematic way: the themes of these Rooms They are: "the interpretation of colonial art", "The Order of Mount Carmel", "The Nativity and the Holy Family"; "The Colonial Goldwork", "The Passion of Christ"; “The Saints of the Church”, “The Virgin Mary”; and the "Monasterio del Carmen de Arequipa". The rooms mentioned above are arranged around one of the convent's cloisters, the so-called Cloister de las Oficinas, built in 1750, which has a beautiful garden, in whose central part, stands out a pool of Huamanga stone.

History
On 1700, the Monastery of San José y Santa Teresa was founded in Arequipa, located on the corner of Melgar and Peral streets, on land donated by the Arbe family. The founders came from the Convent of Santa Teresa of Cusco, led by Mother María de Cristo Ramos Zabala, who would become the first prioress of the Carmelite convent in Arequipa. The Ecclesiastical Council of the Cathedral of Arequipa in the year 1709 requested the Council of Cusco to send some nuns from the Monastery of Santa Teresa of that city to proceed with the installation of the convent of closure of Arequipa.

The works concluded in 1710 under the government of the corregidor don Bartolomé Sánchez Manchego. The architectural complex as a whole was completed in 1750, the same one that consists of a beautiful church, a sumptuous cloister and a beautiful doorway.

Museum tour
In its more than 300 years of existence, the Monastery has been hoarding paintings, sculptures, furniture, goldsmiths, decorative arts, canvases, mural painting and everyday objects from different periods, origins and artistic styles. Without a doubt, the Museum offers one of the richest and best exhibited displays of artistic objects from the 16th to the 19th centuries in Peru.

The  Virceroyalty Art Museum of Santa Teresa has the following spaces to visit:

Old Doorway (Viceroyal Art Interpretation Room): Through 4 didactic showcases, it is shown how the mural painting on tuff was done, the way in which the gold leaf was painted and applied on the old canvases, the steps of the elaboration of the sculptures of maguey and glued fabric, and techniques for decorating furniture and other wooden objects.
Cloister de las oficinas: Here the nuns carried out their trades (office of the Mother Prioress, porter's lodge, wardrobe, infirmary, bell ringing, etc.). It is one of the few Arequipa cloisters that still retains its complete gardening, which, in addition to pleasing the eye, provided moisture in the dry climate of Arequipa. It was built in 1750. A fountain from the same period stands out in the central part, carved in alabaster. In the upper part of the walls there are verses inspired by texts of Santa Teresa and other Carmelite saints, the same ones that are printed in a small book that can be bought in the museum's Candy Store.
Fourth priory (Room of the Order of Carmen): It was the office of the Mother Prioress. In this room we can see paintings of Saint Teresa of Jesus, Saint John of the Cross, and other Carmelite saints, as well as a large reliquary with the relics of saints of the Carmelite Order, among other pieces.
Linen room(Room of the Nativity and the Holy Family): In the linen room (ropería) the nuns made their habits and other clothing. The most important piece in the room, and one of the most valuable in the collection, is the impressive Nativity Trunk, whose pieces were made around 1730, in Quito, Ecuador, and brought from there on the back of a mule. Along with other pieces, you can also see a beautiful collection of images of the Child Jesus.
Nursing (Goldsmith's room): Where you can see an interesting sample of religious gold and silver pieces.
Chapter House: Here, the nuns have met since the mid-18th century, to make decisions of special importance to their community, which is why it maintains the use and decoration with which it was found before opening the Museum, which is why it is part of the "Living Museum". Of special interest in this room is the mural painting, in the Rococo style, from the end of the 18th century and the beginning of the 19th. There are also several canvases inspired by old European engravings, such as The Adoration of the Golden Calf; two scenes from the life of King David, among others.
Lower Choir: The Lower Choir is another of the rooms that make up the "Living Museum" of Saint Teresa, as it is still used by the nuns to participate in daily Mass and perform their community prayers. One of them is the sung prayer of the Angelus and the Sixth Hour, which visitors can hear at 12 noon from the adjoining room. The ornamentation found here has also been preserved, made up of several paintings and sculptures of various themes, materials and periods, of impressive beauty.
Confessional or Sala de Profundis (Room of the Passion of Christ): In this room you can see a complete Via Crucis, made up of 14 small canvases with carved and gilt frames, in the Rococo style. We also find a single showcase with a beautiful wood carving of Christ After the Flagellation, a true masterpiece of Baroque art.
Bell Room (Hall of the Saints of the Church): At noon, this room is closed to the public, and by means of an interesting system of pulleys, the tinkering sister plays the three chimes that call the Angelus, from the cloister you can see the movement of the ropes and hear the sound of the bells, as it has been done since 1710. The sculptures of holy founders of orders that have or have had a presence in Arequipa stand out in a showcase: St. Francis of Assisi, St. Dominic de Guzmán, Saint Ignatius of Loyola, St. Peter Nolasco and Saint Teresa of Jesus. Also very realistic is the life-size image of St. Peter of Alcántara, probably made in Quito, with the face and hands cast in lead, and carefully polychromed.
High Choir (Hall of the Virgin Mary): The High Choir also remains in use, being part of the Living Museum. Here the nuns go up to participate, singing, in the festive Masses. During the colony, one of the most used artistic representations in the evangelization process was the maternal figure of the Virgin Mary. Here we find beautiful carvings of different Marian invocations typical of America, especially in the Andean area. Of special interest is the sculpture, in natural size, of the Transit of the Virgin, in which an unknown artist has carved the image with the posture of a dead person, but with open eyes, because according to Church tradition, the Virgin he did not die, but ascended to Heaven body and soul.
Rooms of Daily Life: There are two rooms, in the first one is the parlor that was used for the nuns to eventually receive a visit. Today the room shows various objects related to the daily life of this Monastery, such as music, pharmacy, making hosts and incense, painting, cooking, among others. Various objects that tell us about the work of the cloistered nuns. In the second Room on the same theme, a selection of porcelain pieces from China, Spain, among others, is now on display. Most likely, the tableware presented here arrived at the Monastery as part of the dowry that the family of each nun had to deliver for the maintenance of the new nun.
Nursing (Room of the Angels and Archangels): In this room, attached to the infirmary, part of the collection of sculptures and paintings of Angels and Archangels of the Monastery is exhibited. One of the most important contributions made by Andean artists to universal art is the iconographic creation of angels and archangels as celestial warriors.
Service Alley: In the rooms of this colorful corridor lived the service personnel who helped the entire community, that is, all the nuns, and not a religious in particular. The Monastery had maids only until the beginning of the 20th century. Occasional workers and even the oxen that regularly entered the garden to plow the cultivated land also passed through this passage.
Courtyard of la Cerería: In this patio you can see a gate and a door that lead to the old Big Shed, where the processional litters were kept, and where today the new gatehouse of the Monastery works. In the old chandlery (candle store), the Museum's toilets now operate.
Deposit of the doorway (Temporary exhibition room): Here the supplies that entered the Monastery through the goal were kept. We found three small niches that maintain a slightly lower temperature than the rest of the room, which was very useful for preserving food. In this space they present diverse artistic samples.

Candy store
The confectionery of the monastery is located at the entrance of the Museum, it was the external part of the parlor, so it was used in the past by the nuns to communicate with family and friends who visited them. As in the Santa Catalina Monastery and the Santa Rosa Monastery, the nuns make cakes and desserts with old recipes from the city of Arequipa, such as Wrapped Apples, Cigarrillos (millefeuille cake with lackey filling), Chicharrones (millefeuille cake with menjar blanc), among others. The candy store also sells handmade rose soaps, natural apple vinegar, scapulars, honey, pollen and souvenirs.

See also
List of colonial buildings in Arequipa

References

Roman Catholic churches in Arequipa
Roman Catholic churches completed in 1750
1700 establishments in the Spanish Empire
Spanish Colonial architecture in Peru
Museums in Peru
Roman Catholic monasteries in Peru

es:Monasterio de Santa Teresa (Arequipa)